Maurolicus stehmanni is a species of ray-finned fish in the genus Maurolicus. It is found in the Southwest Atlantic.

References 

Fish described in 1993
Sternoptychidae